
Ralph Vaughan Williams composed his setting of the Magnificat or Song of Mary, one of the three New Testament canticles, in 1932. It is scored for contralto soloist, women's chorus, and an orchestra consisting of two flutes (the first player has a very prominent solo part; the second player doubles on piccolo), two oboes, cor anglais, two clarinets, two bassoons, four horns, two trumpets, timpani, triangle, cymbals, bass drum, tambourine, Indian drum, glockenspiel, celesta, harp, organ, and strings.

References

Citations

Sources

External links 
  Ralph Vaughan Williams / Magnificat Oxford University Press

Compositions by Ralph Vaughan Williams
Vaughan Williams
1932 compositions